Bob Lawrie was an Australian football player who played who played for the Socceroos 8 times.

References

Portsmouth F.C. players
Australian soccer players
Australia international soccer players
Association football forwards
Australian soccer coaches
1932 births
Living people